Altagracia may refer to:

Settlements
 Altagracia, city in Nicaragua
 La Altagracia, province in the Dominican Republic
 Los Puertos de Altagracia, city in Zulia, Venezuela
 Altagracia de Orituco, city in Guárico, Venezuela
 Altagracia (Cedeño), one of the six civil parishes of Cedeño Municipality, Bolívar, Venezuela
 Altagracia (Torres), one of the seventeen civil parishes of Torres Municipality, Lara, Venezuela
 Altagracia (Sucre), one of the seven civil parishes of Sucre Municipality, Sucre, Venezuela
 Altagracia (Caracas), one of the 22 civil parishes of the Libertador Bolivarian Municipality, Caracas, Venezuela
 Altagracia de La Montaña, one of the seven civil parishes of the municipality Guaicaipuro, Miranda, Venezuela

Other
 Basílica Catedral Nuestra Señora de la Altagracia, basilica in the Dominican Republic
 Our Lady of Altagracia, patron saint of the Dominican Republic, venerated in Higüey
 La Mujer de Judas, Venezuelan TV series known as Altagracia

See also
 Alta Gracia, city in Argentina